The 138th General Assembly of the U.S. state of Georgia convened its first session on January 7, 1985, at the Georgia State Capitol in Atlanta.  The 138th Georgia General Assembly succeeded the 137th and served as the precedent for the 139th General Assembly in 1987.

Party standings

Senate

House of Representatives 

*Active political parties in Georgia are not limited to the Democratic and Republican parties.  Libertarians, and occasionally others, run candidates in elections.  However, for the 1985-86 session of the General Assembly, only the two major parties were successful in electing legislators to office.

Officers

Senate

Presiding Officer

Majority leadership

Minority leadership

House of Representatives

Presiding Officer

Majority leadership

Minority leadership

Members of the State Senate

Members of the House of Representatives

External links

Georgia General Assembly website 
Official Georgia Government Publications - Library - Link to "Picture Book"

Georgia (U.S. state) legislative sessions
1985 in American politics
1986 in American politics
1985 in Georgia (U.S. state)
1986 in Georgia (U.S. state)